Fernando Andrés Márquez (born 10 December 1987) is an Argentine professional footballer who plays as a forward.

During 2017, Márquez played for Defensa y Justicia on loan from Club Atlético Belgrano.

Honours

Club
Johor Darul Ta'zim
 Malaysia Super League: 2018

References

External links

 

1987 births
Argentine footballers
Association football forwards
Unión de Santa Fe footballers
Crucero del Norte footballers
Club Atlético Belgrano footballers
Defensa y Justicia footballers
Living people
Footballers from Santa Fe, Argentina
Primera Nacional players
Torneo Argentino A players
Argentine Primera División players